The 52nd World Science Fiction Convention (Worldcon), also known as ConAdian, was held on 1–5 September 1994 at the Crowne Plaza, Place Louis Riel, and Sheraton hotels, and the Winnipeg Convention Centre in Winnipeg, Manitoba, Canada.

The chairman was John Mansfield.

Participants 

Attendance was approximately 3,570.

Guests of Honour 

 Anne McCaffrey (pro)
 George Barr (artist)
 Robert Runte (fan)
 Barry B. Longyear (toastmaster)

Awards

1994 Hugo Awards 

 Best Novel: Green Mars by Kim Stanley Robinson
 Best Novella: "Down in the Bottomlands" by Harry Turtledove
 Best Novelette: "Georgia on My Mind" by Charles Sheffield
 Best Short Story: "Death on the Nile" by Connie Willis
 Best Non-Fiction Book: The Encyclopedia of Science Fiction by John Clute and Peter Nicholls
 Best Dramatic Presentation: Jurassic Park
 Best Original Artwork: Space Fantasy Commemorative Stamp Booklet by Stephen Hickman
 Best Professional Editor: Kristine Kathryn Rusch
 Best Professional Artist: Bob Eggleton
 Best Semiprozine: Science Fiction Chronicle, edited by Andrew I. Porter
 Best Fanzine: Mimosa, edited by Dick Lynch & Nicki Lynch
 Best Fan Writer: Dave Langford
 Best Fan Artist: Brad W. Foster

Other awards 

 John W. Campbell Award for Best New Writer: Amy Thomson

Notes 

ConAdian was the first Worldcon with its own official website.

See also 

 Hugo Award
 Science fiction
 Speculative fiction
 World Science Fiction Society
 Worldcon

References

External links 

 Official website(archive)
 NESFA.org: The Long List
 NESFA.org: 1994 convention notes 
 Video of the 1994 Hugo Awards Ceremony, on YouTube

1994 conferences
1994 in Canada
Science fiction conventions in Canada
Worldcon